The .400 Jeffery Nitro Express or .450/400 Nitro Express 3-inch is a medium bore, bottlenecked, Nitro Express cartridge designed by W.J. Jeffery & Co in 1902, intended for use in single shot and double rifles.

Development
The W.J. Jeffery & Co developed the .400 Jeffery NE from the .450/400 3-inch Nitro Express, following extraction problems with the latter cartridge.

The .450/400 3-inch NE was recreated by loading the old .450/400 3-inch Black Powder Express with cordite, transforming a low-velocity deerstalking cartridge into a genuine big-game hunting round capable of tackling even the largest Indian and African game.  The conversion was not initially entirely successful, under the increased pressures of the cordite loading the long neck could stick in the chamber causing the rim to pull off at extraction, a problem not encountered with the milder black powder loadings.  To counter this, W.J. Jeffery & Co reduced the length of the case to 3-inches and moved the neck further forward, creating this cartridge, as such it was never loaded with black powder.

Unlike earlier .450/400 3-inch NE cases the .400 Jeffery NE was standardised on the .410 caliber bullets, renewed interest in the double rifles meant more bullets in this caliber were becoming available.

Dimensions

Use
The .450/400 NE in both the 3-inch and 3-inch versions were extremely popular in Africa and India, prior to the introduction of the .375 Holland & Holland they were considered the best all-round African hunting caliber.  Both cartridges were extremely popular in India with Maharajas and British sportsmen.

Karamojo Bell started his elephant hunting career with a Jeffery built .450/400 double rifle prior to moving to his famous .275 Rigby.  Jim Corbett switched from a .500 Black Powder Express to a W.J. Jeffery boxlock double rifle in .400 Jeffery NE which he used along with a .275 Rigby.

In his African Rifles and Cartridges, John "Pondoro" Taylor stated the 3-inch and 3-inch .450/400 NE cartridges to be "the grandest weapons imaginable for all big game hunting" adequate for all African game in almost all conditions when used by an experienced hunter.  He further stated "I derived greater pleasure from using the .400 than any other calibre; and no weapon behaved more successfully in my hands. I would happily finish the remainder of my career with a pair of them and nothing else-unless it was a third!"

Major Percy Powell-Cotton wrote the "Jeffery .400 ejector express rifle I first carried in my Abyssinian expedition is my favourite weapon for dangerous game.  With all nickel-covered bullets it is excellent for head or heart shots at elephant.  With the lead just showing at the nose they do good work on rhino and buffalo; whilst with half the lead exposed I do not think you can get a better weapon for lion."

Elmer Keith stated this cartridge would be his first choice when hunting brown bear in Alaska.

See also
 Nitro Express
 List of rifle cartridges
 10 mm caliber other cartridges of similar caliber size.

References

External links

 African Hunting Gazette, ".450/400 Nitro Express 3" (Jeffery)", africanhuntinggazette.com, retrieved 11 August 2018.
 Ammo-One, ".450/400 Nitro Express", ammo-one.com, retrieved 7 November 2017.
 Cartridgecollector, ".400 3 inch Jeffery Nitro Express", cartridgecollector.net, retrieved 7 November 2017.
 The Spanish Association of Cartridge Collectors, ".450/.400 Nitro Express 3 inch", municion.org , retrieved 7 November 2017.

Pistol and rifle cartridges
British firearm cartridges
W.J. Jeffery & Co cartridges